The 19th Brigade is an Army Reserve brigade of the British Army. As the 19th Infantry Brigade it fought in the First and Second world wars.

The brigade became 19 Light Brigade in 2005, and moved to Northern Ireland following the end of Operation Banner and "normalisation" of British military operations in the province. Following the 2010 Strategic Defence and Security Review (SDSR), the Brigade entered suspended animation in March 2013. As part of the Future Soldier reform the brigade was reactivated in 2022.

First World War
19th Infantry Brigade was not part of the original British Expeditionary Force (BEF) but was formed in France between 19 and 22 August 1914 from line of communication defence battalions as an independent brigade. It immediately went into action at the Battle of Mons on 23 August, then participated in the Retreat from Mons and subsequent battles under various corps headquarters.

From 12 October 1914 the brigade was attached to 6th Division at the time of the Battle of Armentières, transferring to 27 Division on 31 May 1915. On 19 August 1915, 19th Bde formally joined 2nd Division (replacing 4th (Guards) Bde, which had left to join the new Guards Division). It served with 2nd Division at the Battle of Loos.

These attachments had all been to formations of the Regular Army, but on 25 November 1915, 2nd Division exchanged 19th Bde with a brigade from 33rd Division, a newly-arrived 'New Army' ('Kitchener's Army') formation. The intention was to share experience, and as soon as it joined 33rd Division, the brigade exchanged one of its veteran battalions with one of the  newcomers. It remained with 33rd Division on the Western Front until the Armistice with Germany. Like the rest of the BEF, it was reduced from a four-battalion to a three-battalion establishment in February 1918.

Order of battle
The independent brigade's initial composition was as follows:
 2nd Battalion, Royal Welch Fusiliers – to 38th (Welsh) Division 4 February 1918
 1st Battalion, Cameronians (Scottish Rifles)
 1st Battalion, Middlesex Regiment – to 98th Bde in 33rd Division 27 November 1915 
 2nd Battalion, Argyll and Sutherland Highlanders – to 98th Bde 27 November 1915
 19th Bde Ammunition Column, Royal Field Artillery – probably absorbed into 2nd Divisional Ammunition Column
 19th Field Ambulance, Royal Army Medical Corps
 No 8 Company, Army Service Corps (ASC) – to 33rd Divisional Train, ASC, 25 November 1915

Subsequent additions:
 1/5th Battalion, Cameronians (Scottish Rifles) (later 5th/6th Battalion) (Territorial Force) – joined 19 November 1914
 Section, 2nd Division Signal Company, Royal Engineers (RE) – transferred with brigade to 33rd Division
 11th Field Company, RE – transferred with brigade to 33rd Division
 20th (Service) Battalion, Royal Fusiliers (3rd Public Schools) – from 98th Bde 27 November 1915; disbanded 2–15 February 1918 
 1/6th Battalion, Cameronians (Scottish Rifles) (TF) – joined from 100th Bde, 33rd Division, and amalgamated with 1/5th Bn 29 May 1916
 1st Battalion Queen's (Royal West Surrey Regiment) – joined from 100th Bde 5 February 1918
 19th Bde Machine Gun Company, Machine Gun Corps (MGC) – formed in the brigade 24 February 1916; joined No 33 Battalion, MGC,  9–19 February 1918
 A/19 Light Trench Mortar Battery – formed by 26 January 1916; became 19/1 LTMB 23 March 1916; amalgamated by 24 June 1916
 B/19 Light Trench Mortar Battery – formed by 15 March 1916; became 19/2 LTMB 23 March 1916; amalgamated by 24 June 1916 19 Light Trench Mortar Battery – formed by 24 June 1916

Brigade Commanders
The following officers commanded the brigade:
 Maj-Gen L.G. Drummond, 22 August 1914, sick 27 August 1914
 Lt-Col B.E. Wards, acting 27 August–5 September 1914
 Brig-Gen Hon F. Gordon, 5 September 1914 – 14 June 1915
 Brig-Gen P.R. Robertson, 14 June 1915 – 13 July 1916
 Brig-Gen C.R.G. Mayne, 13 July 1916–Armistice
 Lt-Col J.G. Chaplin, acting 28–31 August 1916
 Lt-Col St B.R. Sladen, acting 8 March, killed 12 March 1918
 Lt-Col H. Storr, acting 12 March, wounded 13 March 1918
 Lt-Col H.B. Spens, acting 13–25 March 1918

Second World War
The 19th Infantry Brigade was a regular British Army formation at the beginning of the Second World War. It had been raised in 1938 for Internal Security in Palestine, and appears to have joined the 7th Infantry Division on its reformation in September–October 1938. On 3 September 1939, it was converted to HQ Jerusalem Area.

Post-1945
In the late 1970s, as 19 Airportable Brigade, throughout the 1980s, as 19 Infantry Brigade the 19th Brigade was based at Colchester as part of the 3rd Armoured Division.

Structure 1989
Component units in 1989:
 Headquarters 19th Infantry Brigade and 209th Signal Squadron, Royal Corps of Signals
 1st Battalion, King's Own Royal Border Regiment
 1st Battalion, Royal Anglian Regiment
 3rd Battalion, Royal Anglian Regiment
 45th Field Regiment, Royal Artillery
 34th Field Squadron, Royal Engineers

It would have had to cross the Channel to join the rest of the division, stationed with the British Army of the Rhine in Germany. Following the disbandment of the 3rd Armoured Division following the end of the Cold War, the brigade joined the new 3rd Mechanised Division, and moved to Catterick Garrison in Yorkshire in April 1993. The brigade Signal squadron was based at Gaza Barracks, Catterick garrison. The brigade deployed as part of Operation Grapple 5, the UK contribution to the United Nations Protection Force (UNPROFOR) in the former Yugoslavia, between November 1994 and May 1995. 

They were replaced by 20 Armoured Brigade HQ and Signal Sqn.

In September 1995, the HQ and Signal Sqn deployed on Exercise SUMAN WARRIOR at Canberra lines, Terendak Camp, Malaysia. Members of the Signal Sqn also deployed on EX Med Man 5 in 1996 as part of the 1KORBR battle group at British Army Training Unit Suffield, Canada. The HQ and Signal Sqn then deployed to Operation Lodestar in the Former Yugoslavia between November 1997 and May 1998.  This was as part of the NATO SFOR deployment. The brigade HQ and Signal Squadron were part of MND SW HQ AND SIGNAL SQN based at the Banja Luka Metal Factory and other locations.

As part of the Delivering Security in a Changing World review in 2003, it was announced that the brigade was to become a 'Light' formation. The Brigade deployed on Operation Telic 2 between May and November 2003 taking over from 7 Armoured Brigade. The brigade became 19 Light Brigade as of 1 January 2005, and deployed to Iraq on Operation Telic 9 (November 2006 – May 2007) for an unusually long 7-month tour before handing over to 1 Mechanised Brigade and returning to Catterick. It then began moving to Northern Ireland following the end of Operation Banner and "normalisation" of British military operations in the province.

The Brigade deployed on Operation Herrick 10 in April 2009, replacing 3 Commando Brigade, where it planned and executed Operation Panther's Claw – named after Bagheera, the panther forming the Brigade insignia. The Bde returned to the UK in October 2009 having taken over 70 fatalities- significantly more than seen in previous operational tours of Afghanistan.

Secretary of Defence Liam Fox announced on 18 July 2011 that 19 Bde was to be disbanded as part of the 2010 Strategic Defence and Security Review (SDSR) in March 2013.

Brigade Commanders
Recent commanders have included:
19th Infantry Brigade
 1967–1969 Brigadier WNR Scotter, Late KORBR
 1969–1971 Brigadier GLC Cooper, Late RE
 1973–1975 Brigadier JM Glover, Late RGJ
 1975–1977 Brigadier RF Vincent, Late RA
 1985–1987 Brigadier TP Toyne Sewell, Late KOSB
 1989–1991 Brigadier CD Farrar-Hockley, Late PARA
 1991–1993 Brigadier EJ Webb-Carter, Late GREN GDS
 1994–1995 Brigadier RDS Gordon, Late 17/21L
 1995–1997 Brigadier ADA Duncan, Late PWO
 1997–2000 Brigadier PTC Pearson, Late RGR
 2000–2001 Brigadier NH Rollo, Late RE
 2001–2003 Brigadier WH Moore, Late RA

19th Light Brigade
 2003–2005 Brigadier C Chapman, Late PARA
 2005–2007 Brigadier TP Evans, Late RIFLES
 2007–2010 Brigadier TB Radford, Late RIFLES
 2010–2012 Brigadier SR Skeates, Late RA
 2012–2013 Brigadier EJR Chamberlain, Late RIFLES

19th Brigade
 2022–present Brigadier O Lyttle, Late R IRISH

 Reformation 
In 2021, under the Future Soldier it was announced that the 19th Brigade would be reformed with its headquarters in York.  The brigade will be tasked with home defence and home 'resilience' duties.   The Brigade reformed on 23 July 2022 under command of 1st (United Kingdom) Division.

Current structure
The brigade's current structure is:
Headquarters, 19th Brigade''', at Imphal Barracks, York
Queen's Own Yeomanry, at Fenham Barracks, Newcastle upon Tyne
Scottish and North Irish Yeomanry, at Redford Barracks, Edinburgh
52nd Lowland Volunteers, 6th Battalion, Royal Regiment of Scotland, at Walcheren Barracks, Glasgow
51st Highland Volunteers, 7th Battalion, Royal Regiment of Scotland at Queen's Barracks, Perth
4th Battalion, Duke of Lancaster's Regiment (King's, Lancashire and Border), at Kimberley Barracks, Preston
3rd Battalion, Royal Anglian Regiment, in Bury St Edmunds
4th Battalion, Yorkshire Regiment (14th/15th, 19th and 33rd/76th Foot), at Worsley Barracks, York
2nd Battalion, Royal Irish Regiment (27th (Inniskilling), 83rd, 87th and Ulster Defence Regiment), at Thiepval Barracks, Lisburn
6th Battalion, The Rifles, at Wyvern Barracks, Exeter
8th Battalion, The Rifles, in Bishop Auckland

References

Bibliography
 A.F. Becke,History of the Great War: Order of Battle of Divisions, Part 1: The Regular British Divisions, London: HM Stationery Office, 1934/Uckfield: Naval & Military Press, 2007, .
 A.F. Becke,History of the Great War: Order of Battle of Divisions, Part 3b: New Army Divisions (30–41) and 63rd (R.N.) Division, London: HM Stationery Office, 1939/Uckfield: Naval & Military Press, 2007, .
 James E. Edmonds, History of the Great War: Military Operations, France and Belgium, 1914'', Vol I, 3rd Edn, London: Macmillan,1933/Woking: Shearer, 1986, .

External links
 Chris Baker, The Long, Long Trail
 19 Light Brigade- on British Army official website
British Army Dispositions in 1939
 "Reinforcements Fly To M.E." British Pathe newsreel 1951

Infantry brigades of the British Army in World War I
Infantry brigades of the British Army in World War II
Military units and formations of the United Kingdom in the War in Afghanistan (2001–2021)
Organisations based in North Yorkshire